Fear and Trembling (original Danish title: Frygt og Bæven) is a philosophical work by Søren Kierkegaard, published in 1843 under the pseudonym Johannes de silentio (Latin for John of the Silence).  The title is a reference to a line from Philippians 2:12, "...continue to work out your salvation with fear and trembling." — itself a probable reference to Psalms 55:5, "Fear and trembling came upon me..."

Kierkegaard wanted to understand the anxiety that must have been present in Abraham during the Binding of Isaac.

Abraham had a choice to complete the task or to refuse to comply with God's orders. He resigned himself to the three-and-a-half-day journey and to the loss of his son. "He said nothing to Sarah, nothing to Eliezer. Who, after all, could understand him, for did not the nature of temptation extract from him a pledge of silence? He split the firewood, he bound Isaac, he lit the fire, he drew the knife." Because he kept everything to himself and chose not to reveal his feelings he "isolated himself as higher than the universal." Kierkegaard envisions two types of people in Fear and Trembling and Repetition. One lives in hope, Abraham, the other lives in memory, The Young Man and Constantin Constantius. He discussed them beforehand in Lectures delivered before the Symparanekromenoi and The Unhappiest Man. One hopes for happiness from something "out there" while the other finds happiness from something in themself.  This he brought out in his upbuilding discourse, published on the same date. 

Kierkegaard says, "Infinite resignation is the last stage before faith, so anyone who has not made this movement does not have faith, for only in infinite resignation does an individual become conscious of his eternal validity, and only then can one speak of grasping existence by virtue of faith." He spoke about this kind of consciousness in an earlier book. "There comes a moment in a person's life when immediacy is ripe, so to speak, and when the spirit requires a higher form, when it wants to lay hold of itself as spirit. As immediate spirit, a person is bound up with all the earthly life, and now spirit wants to gather itself together out of this dispersion, so to speak, and to transfigure itself in itself; the personality wants to become conscious in its eternal validity. If this does not happen, if the movement is halted, if it is repressed, then depression sets in." Once Abraham became conscious of his eternal validity he arrived at the door of faith and acted according to his faith. In this action he became a knight of faith. In other words, one must give up all his or her earthly possessions in infinite resignation and must also be willing to give up whatever it is that he or she loves more than God.

Kierkegaard used the ethical system of Georg Wilhelm Friedrich Hegel and the aesthetic stories of Agnes and the merman, Iphigenia at Aulis and others to help the reader understand the difference between the inner world of the spirit and the outer world of ethics and aesthetics.

Several authorities consider the work autobiographical. It can be explained as Kierkegaard's way of working himself through the loss of his fiancée, Regine Olsen. Abraham becomes Kierkegaard and Isaac becomes Regine in this interpretation.

Structure 
Kierkegaard's pseudonymous works begin with a preface by Johannes de silentio. His Upbuilding Discourses begin with a dedication to the single individual, who has become Abraham in this work.

Next is his Exordium. It begins like this, "Once upon a time there was a man who as a child had heard that beautiful story of how God tempted Abraham and of how Abraham withstood the temptation, kept the faith, and, contrary to expectation, got a son a second time." And ends like this, "That man was not an exegetical scholar. He did not know Hebrew; if he had known Hebrew, he perhaps would have easily understood the story of Abraham."

The Exordium is followed by the Eulogy on Abraham. How did Abraham become the father of faith? Kierkegaard says, "No one who was great in the world will be forgotten, but everyone was great in his own way, and everyone in proportion to the greatness of that which he loved. He who loved himself became great by virtue of himself, and he who loved other men became great by his devotedness, but he who loved God became greatest of all. Everyone shall be remembered, but everyone became great in proportion to his expectancy. "One became great by expecting the possible, another by expecting the eternal; but he who expected the impossible became greatest of all. Everyone shall be remembered, but everyone was great wholly in proportion to the magnitude of that with which he struggled. For he who struggled with the world became great by conquering the world, and he who struggled with himself became great by conquering himself, but he who struggled with God became greatest of all."

Now he presents his Problemata (problems): "Abraham has gained a prescriptive right to be a great man, so that what he does is great and when another does the same thing it is a sin. (...) The ethical expression of what Abraham did is that he meant to murder Isaac, the religious expression is that he meant to sacrifice Isaac – but precisely in this contradiction is the anxiety that can make a person sleepless, and yet, without this anxiety Abraham is not who he is." He asked how a murderer can be revered as the father of faith.

 Problema 1: Is there a Teleological Suspension of the Ethical?
 Problema 2: Is there an Absolute Duty to God?
 Problema 3: Was it Ethically Defensible for Abraham to Conceal His Undertaking from Sarah, From Eliezer, and from Isaac?

Kierkegaard's method 
Kierkegaard says that everyone has a choice in life. Freedom consists in using that choice. We each have the right to speak or not to speak and the right to act or not to act. Kierkegaard's Either/Or is God or the world. He says,

Teleological Suspension of the Ethical 

What is the ethical? Kierkegaard steers the reader to Hegel's book Elements of the Philosophy of Right especially the chapter on "The Good and Conscience" where he writes, "It is the right of the subjective will that it should regard as good what it recognizes as authoritative. It is the individual's right, too, that an act, as outer realization of an end, should be counted right or wrong, good or evil, lawful or unlawful, according to his knowledge of the worth it has when objectively realized. (...) Right of insight into the good is different from right of insight with regard to action as such. The right of objectivity means that the act must be a change in the actual world, be recognized there, and in general be adequate to what has validity there. Whoso will act in this actual world has thereby submitted to its laws, and recognized the right of objectivity. Similarly in the state, which is the objectivity of the conception of reason, legal responsibility does not adapt itself to what any one person holds to be reasonable or unreasonable. It does not adhere to subjective insight into right or wrong, good or evil, or to the claims which an individual makes for the satisfaction of his conviction. In this objective field the right of insight is reckoned as insight into what is legal or illegal, or the actual law. It limits itself to its simplest meaning, namely, knowledge of or acquaintance with what is lawful and binding. Through the publicity of the laws and through general customs the state removes from the right of insight that which is for the subject its formal side. It removes also the element of chance, which at our present standpoint still clings to it."

Abraham didn't follow this theory. Kierkegaard says Hegel was wrong because he didn't protest against Abraham as the father of faith and call him a murderer. He had suspended the ethical and failed to follow the universal.<ref>"Universal, Universality:  Hegel's use incorporates the familiar sense of universal as non-particular, without specific location in time and space; but he differs from platonists in denying that universals are timeless self-subsistents, and from nominalists in denying that universals are mere abstractions. The stages (moments) of the Concept in Hegel's triad are the universal, the particular, and the individual: universality develops, first into particularity, and then into individuality. The universal constitutes the essence of a thing; when a thing is fully developed (actual), the universal is concrete. Hegel denies that thought can refer to unique individuals: it is exclusively concerned with universals." [Hegel: Glossary ]</ compare to Fear and Trembling p. 82</ref>

Kierkegaard has a different theory about the difference between right and wrong and he stated it in the little discourse at the end of Either/Or. He wrote, "If a person is sometimes in the right, sometimes in the wrong, to some degree in the right, to some degree in the wrong, who, then, is the one who makes that decision except the person himself, but in the decision may he not again be to some degree in the right and to some degree in the wrong? Or is he a different person when he judges his act than when he acts? Is doubt to rule, then, continually to discover new difficulties, and is care to accompany the anguished soul and drum past experiences into it? Or would we prefer continually to be in the right in the way irrational creatures are? Then we have only the choice between being nothing in relation to God or having to begin all over again every moment in eternal torment, yet without being able to begin, for if we are able to decide definitely with regard to the previous moment, and so further and further back. Doubt is again set in motion, care again aroused; let us try to calm it by deliberating on: The Upbuilding That Lies In The Thought That In Relation To God We Are Always In The Wrong."

Kierkegaard says, "Hegelian philosophy culminates in the thesis that the outer is the inner and the inner is the outer." Hegel wrote, "the two elemental considerations: first, the idea of freedom as the absolute and final aim; secondly the means for realizing it, i.e., the subjective side of knowledge and will, with its life movement, and activity. We then recognized the state as the moral whole and the reality of freedom, and consequently as the objective unity of these two elements." Abraham had to choose between the ethical requirements of his surroundings and what he regarded as his absolute duty to God.

Hegel says, "When I am conscious of my freedom as inner substantive reality, I do not act; yet if I do act and seek principles, I must try to obtain definite characters for my act. The demand is then made that this definite context shall be deduced from the conception of free will. Hence, if it is right to absorb right and duty into subjectivity, it is on the other hand wrong if this abstract basis of action is not again evolved. Only in times when reality is a hollow, unspiritual, and shadowy existence, can a retreat be permitted out of the actual into an inner life."

Absolute Duty to God 

Johannes de Silentio speaks of the difference between the method Descartes found for himself and the system that Hegel wants to build. He says, "I throw myself down in the deepest submission before every systematic ransacker: This [book] is not the system; it has not the least thing to do with the system. I invoke everything good for the system and for the Danish shareholders in this omnibus, for it will hardly become a tower. I wish them all, each and every one, success and good fortune." Respectfully, Johannes De Silentio Kierkegaard chooses to "work out his own salvation in fear and trembling". Johannes Climacus, another pseudonymous author, wrote in 1846 that Kierkegaard isn't interested in creating yet another system. He says, "The present author is by no means a philosopher. He is in a poetic and refined way a supplementary clerk who neither writes the system nor gives promises of the system, who neither exhausts himself on the system nor binds himself to the system. He writes because to him it is a luxury that is all the more pleasant and apparent the fewer there are who buy and read what he writes."

Kierkegaard introduces the idea of the paradox and the leap in Fear and Trembling. He says, "The act of resignation does not require faith, for what I gain is my eternal consciousness. This is a purely philosophical movement that I venture to make when it is demanded and can discipline myself to make, because every time some finitude will take power over me, I starve myself into submission until I make the movement, for my eternal consciousness is my love for God, and for me that is the highest of all. The act of resignation does not require faith, but to get the least little bit more than my eternal consciousness requires faith, for this is the paradox."  He explains himself in Concluding Unscientific Postscript, where he writes, "In that book [Fear and Trembling] I had perceived how the leap, according to the author, as the decision par excellence becomes specifically decisive for what is Christian and for every dogmatic category. This can be achieved neither through Schelling's intellectual intuition nor through what Hegel, flouting Schelling's idea, wants to put in its place, the inverse operation of the method. All Christianity is rooted in paradox, according to Fear and Trembling-yes, it is rooted in fear and trembling (which are specifically the desperate categories of Christianity and the leap)-whether one accepts it (that is, is a believer) or rejects it (for the very reason that it is the paradox)."

Concealing His Undertaking from Sarah, From Eliezer, and from Isaac 
The world of Ethics demands disclosure and punishes hiddenness but aesthetics rewards hiddenness according to Kierkegaard. Kierkegaard says, "Greek tragedy is blind. A son murders his father, but not until later does he learn that it was his father. A sister is going to sacrifice her brother but realizes it at the crucial moment."

Abraham hid everything he did. He kept everything from Sarah, Eliezer, and Isaac. But Abraham's 'inability to become open is terror" to him. He keeps absolute silence about the whole affair. A single individual like Abraham might be "able to transpose the whole content of faith into conceptual form, but, it does not follow that he has comprehended faith, comprehended how he entered into it or how it entered into him." Abraham was experiencing what Kierkegaard called "reflective grief" but not just grief but joy also because he was beginning a new association with an unknown power. Grief and joy can both keep an individual quiet in inward reflection, perhaps it is a mixture of both that Abraham felt. 

Kierkegaard says, "If Agamemnon himself, not Calchas, should have drawn the knife to kill Iphigenia, he would only have demeaned himself if in the very last moment he had said a few words, for the meaning of his deed was, after all, obvious to everybody, the process of reverence, sympathy, emotion, and tears was completed, and then, too, his life had no relation to spirit-that is, he was not a teacher or a witness of the spirit."

He says of Abraham, "If the task had been different, if the Lord had commanded Abraham to bring Isaac up to Mount Moriah so that he could have his lightning strike Isaac and take him as a sacrifice in that way, then Abraham plainly would have been justified in speaking as enigmatically as he did, for then he himself could not have known what was going to happen. But given the task as assigned to Abraham, he himself has to act; consequently, he has to know in the crucial moment what he himself will do, and consequently, he has to know that Isaac is going to be sacrificed." Kierkegaard puts it this way in another book, "We shall not say with the Preacher (Ecclesiastes 4:10), 'Woe to him who is alone; if he falls, there is no one else to raise him up,' for God is indeed still the one who both raises up and casts down, for the one who lives in association with people and the solitary one; we shall not cry, 'Woe to him,' but surely an 'Ah, that he might not go astray,' because he is indeed alone in testing himself to see whether it is God's call he is following or a voice of temptation, whether defiance and anger are not mixed embitteringly in his endeavor."

The task God gave to Abraham was so horrifying that he could tell no one about it because no one would understand him. Ethics forbade it as well as aesthetics. Abraham became a knight of faith because he was willing to do what God asked of him. "He didn't trouble anyone with his suffering." Abraham was wrong as far as ethics is concerned but right as far the Absolute is concerned. Kierkegaard says, "wishing to be in the wrong is an expression of an infinite relationship, and wanting to be in the right, or finding it painful to be in the wrong, is an expression of a finite relationship! Hence, it is upbuilding always to be in the wrong-because only the infinite builds up; the finite does not!" What was the most Abraham could do in his relationship with God? Remain faithful to his commitment to God. He accomplished that by actually lifting the knife with the intention of carrying out his mission. In short, he acted. Here the intention was more important than the result. He had faith and had to go no further to please God.

Regine 
Kierkegaard says, "By my own strength I cannot get the least little thing that belongs to finitude, for I continually use my strength to resign everything. By my own strength I can give up the princess, and I will not sulk about it but find joy and peace and rest in my pain, but by my own strength I cannot get her back again, for I use all my strength in resigning. On the other hand, by faith, says that marvelous knight, by faith you will get her by virtue of the absurd. But this movement I cannot make. As soon as I want to begin, everything reverses itself, and I take refuge in the pain of resignation. I am able to swim in life, but I am too heavy for this mystical hovering."

The story of the princess and of Agnes and the merman can be interpreted autobiographically.  Here Kierkegaard is using the story of Abraham to help himself understand his relationship with Regine Olsen. She was his only love as far as "finitude" is concerned and he gave her up. Kierkegaard says the young man who was in love with the princess learned 'the deep secret that even in loving another person one ought to be sufficient to oneself. He is no longer finitely concerned about what the princess does, and precisely this proves that he has made the movement [of faith] infinitely."

Kierkegaard also mentioned Agnes and the Merman in his Journals: "I have thought of adapting [the legend of] Agnes and the Merman from an angle that has not occurred to any poet. The Merman is a seducer, but when he has won Agnes' love he is so moved by it that he wants to belong to her entirely. — But this, you see, he cannot do, since he must initiate her into his whole tragic existence, that he is a monster at certain times, etc., that the Church cannot give its blessing to them. He despairs and in his despair plunges to the bottom of the sea and remains there, but Agnes imagines that he only wanted to deceive her. But this is poetry, not that wretched, miserable trash in which everything revolves around ridiculousness and nonsense. Such a complication can be resolved only by the religious (which has its name because it resolves all witchcraft); if the Merman could believe, his faith perhaps could transform him into a human being."

Kierkegaard tasted his first love in Regine and he said it was "beautiful and healthy, but not perfect." Regine, his first love was his second love; it was an infinite love. But he resigned it in order to serve God. He couldn't explain to Regine how it happened that he changed anymore than Cordelia could explain what happened between her and the seducer in The Seducer's Diary. "She could not confide in anyone, for she had nothing definite to confide. When one has a dream he can tell it, it was real, and yet when she wished to speak of it and relieve her troubled mind, there was nothing to tell. She felt it very keenly. No one could know about it except herself, and yet it rested upon her with an alarming weight." Abraham couldn't confide in Sarah or Eliezer either.

Criticism 

Some have praised the book as one of the lynchpins of the existentialist movement. It was reviewed in Kierkegaard's own time and his response to the review is in Kierkegaard's Journals.

Hans Martensen, a contemporary of Kierkegaard's, had this to say about his ideas,

An article from the Encyclopedia of religion and ethics has the following quote, "in writing B's Papers   [Kierkegaard] had personally attained to a deeper grasp of Christianity, and had come to feel that there was a stage of life higher than the ethico-religious standpoint of B. It was now, probably, that he became more fully cognizant of his plan, and of what was necessary to its development. The higher and more distinctively Christian form of religion is set forth in 'Fear and Trembling, the message of which is illustrated by the fact that Abraham was commanded to do what was ethically wrong, i.e., to kill Isaac, and obeyed in virtue or a personal relation to God; he had faith—he staked the earthly, and yet believed that he should possess it still. Such faith is no common or easy thing, but is a relation to the Absolute which Defies reason, and can be won and held only in an infinite passion."

In 1921 David F. Swenson wrote, "Fear and Trembling uses the story of Abraham's sacrifice of his son. Abraham is not a tragic hero, for he cannot claim, like Jephtah or the Roman consul, a higher ethical justification for his deed. His intention to sacrifice his son has a purely personal motivation, and one which no social ethic can acknowledge; for the highest ethical obligation that his life or the situation reveals is the father's duty of loving his son. Abraham is therefore either a murderer, or a hero of Faith. The detailed exposition elucidates Abraham's situation dialectically and lyrically, bringing out as problemata the teleological suspension of the ethical, the assumption of an absolute duty toward God, and the purely private character of Abraham's procedure; thus showing the paradoxical and transcendent character of a relation in which the individual, contrary to all rule, is precisely as an individual, higher than the community." Scandinavian Studies and Notes Volume VI, No. 7 August 1921 David F. Swenson: Søren Kierkegaard p. 21

In 1923 Lee Hollander wrote the following in his introduction to Fear and Trembling:

Jean-Paul Sartre took up Kierkegaard's ideas in his 1948 book, Existentialism and Humanism like this: 

In 1949 Helmut Kuhn wrote of the dread of the choice to follow God. "The decisive act through which everything is won or lost is called choice a conception formulated by Kierkegaard and faithfully upheld by the majority of Existentialists. Choice, as the term is generally understood, is the act of giving preference to one among several possibilities or of deciding in favor of one or two alternatives. And since every choice has, at least potentially, a moral significance, the primary alternative, which underlies all other alternatives, will be that of good and evil. Choice, according to this common-sense view, lies between good and evil. Kierkegaard and his modern followers entertain an altogether different idea of choice. In the first place, the act under consideration, they insist, is not to be confused with those insignificant decisions with which in every minute of our waking existence we carry on our lives. Each one of these "little choices will reveal itself under analysis as the choice of a means towards a predetermined end. They give effect to a prior determination which underlies and guides them. Not with that merely executive activity are we chiefly concerned as moralists and philosophers. We must rather focus on those cardinal acts on which our whole existence hinges the moments which place us at the parting of roads, and as we then choose, our choice, the dread Either /Or, will either save or ruin us. It is this Great Choice which, as the organizing principle, animates the little choices of our daily lives."

Bernard Martin asked, "Was the revelation to the biblical Abraham of the divine command to sacrifice his son, we may ask (following Kierkegaard), demonic possession or ecstasy? And even if it be allowed that "the ethical and logical norms of ordinary reason" constitute clear-cut and easily applicable criteria, how does ecstatic reason in revelation basically differ from ordinary reason, aside from an emotional "shaking," seeing that it merely affirms and elevates the principles of ordinary reason? However, for Kierkegaard the "emotional shaking" is an external event, which could signify nothing or everything.

Josiah Thompson wrote a biography of Kierkegaard's life, and in it he said,

Mark C. Taylor, of Fordham University writes, "The Abrahamic God is the all-powerful Lord and Master who demands nothing less than the total obedience of his faithful servants. The transcendent otherness of God creates a possibility of a collision between religious commitment and the individual's personal desire and moral duty. Should such a conflict develop, the faithful self must follow Abraham in forgoing desire and suspending duty-even if this means sacrificing one's own son or forsaking one's beloved. (...) The Absolute Paradox occasions an absolute decision by posing the absolute either-or. Either believe or be offended. From the Christian perspective, this crucial decision is of eternal significance.

Another scholar writes, "By writing about Abraham, Kierkegaard can perform a pantomime of walking along the patriarch's path, but he will remain incapable of the leap of faith that was necessary to accomplish the sacrifice. The poet can attain to the movement of infinite resignation, performed by tragic heroes such as Agamemnon who sacrificed his daughter to placate the gods, but this gesture will forever remain only a surrogate of Abraham's absolute faith. Abraham believed by virtue of the absurd, whereby the impossible will happen and all human calculation is abandoned. The commentator strains to approximate the knight's gesture of the absurd, yet lacking faith, he is forbidden to effectuate the transcendent leap. In his necessary reliance on the mediation of concepts to tell the story, the exegete cannot aspire to the uniqueness of Abraham's condition. Versions two and four of Kierkegaard's account state explicitly that, in contradistinction to the biblical model, the imagined Abraham returns home. The patriarch from the Book of Genesis does not even glimpse back towards home but moves on to live in a foreign land. When he settles in Beersheba and buys a burial plot there, he avows: "I am a stranger and a sojourner with you". (Genesis 23.4) He renounces all of his possessions, his family and neighbours, and, sustained by faith, he never mourns his loss. As Kierkegaard remarks, were he merely human, he would weep and long for what he had left behind."

One critic says, "the relationship to Regine is played through with full orchestra by Johannes de Silentio, in the little book Fear and Trembling, which came out October 16, 1843, the same year as Either/Or. It begins with a paraphrase repeated four times, on the story of Abraham's journey to Mount Moriah to offer Isaac. This is continued by the eulogy on Abraham as "the father of faith" who believed by virtue of the absurd. The double meaning is clear, Abraham is both the father who brings his son as an offering, and Kierkegaard who offers Regine." .

Julie Watkin explained more about Kierkegaard's relation to Regine Olsen in her book, Historical Dictionary of Kierkegaard's Philosophy. She says, Kierkegaard wrote Either/Or, Fear and Trembling, and Repetition as a way to get over Regine.

John Stewart's review of the book removes Hegel from the whole structure of the book, He wrote, in 2007, "...nothing stands in the way of a commentator who wants to find a substantive philosophical discussion in these allusions to Hegel, and certainly there is no reason to think that Hegel's and Kierkegaard's views on philosophy of religion or political theory are the same or are consistent with each other. But this abstract comparison of their views does not explain what is at issue in the text. The main point of the references to Hegel here is to criticize Heiberg and Martensen and not any particular doctrine in Hegel's philosophy." He says this becomes more clear when Fear and Trembling is compared to The Concept of Irony.

In 1838 Kierkegaard wrote, 

A famous dispute arose in France when Emmanuel Levinas criticized Kierkegaard and Jacques Derrida defended him. The argument centered upon the text of Fear and Trembling, and whether or not a practitioner of faith could be considered ethical.

Walter Kaufmann addressed faith and ethics: If it really were axiomatic that God could never contravene our conscience and our reason - if we could be sure that he must share our moral judgments - would not God become superfluous as far as ethics is concerned? A mere redundancy? If God is really to make a moral difference in our lives, Kierkegaard insists, we must admit that he might go against our reason and our conscience, and that he should still be obeyed. Walter Kaufmann 1962, Introduction to The Present Age by Soren Kierkegaard 1846

References

Sources

Primary sources 
 Fear and Trembling; Copyright 1843 Søren Kierkegaard – Kierkegaard's Writings; 6 – copyright 1983 – Howard V. Hong
 Concluding Unscientific Postscript to Philosophical Fragments Volume I, by Johannes Climacus, edited by Søren Kierkegaard, Copyright 1846 – Edited and Translated by Howard V. Hong and Edna H. Hong 1992 Princeton University Press
 Either/Or Volume I Edited by Victor Eremita, February 20, 1843, translated by David F. Swenson and Lillian Marvin Swenson Princeton University Press 1971
 Either/Or Volume 2, Edited by Victor Eremita, February 20, 1843, Hong 1987

Secondary sources 
Christian Ethics: (General part) Martensen, H. (Hans), 1808–1884; Spence, C., tr
 Søren Kierkegaard, A Biography, by Johannes Hohlenberg, Translated by T.H. Croxall, Pantheon Books, 1954
Kierkegaard, by Josiah Thompson, Alfred A. Knopf, 1973
 Journeys to selfhood: Hegel & Kierkegaard, by Mark C. Taylor Fordham University Press, 2000
 Historical Dictionary of Kierkegaard's Philosophy, By Julie Watkin, Scarecrow Press, 2001
 Kierkegaard's Relations to Hegel Reconsidered, Cambridge University Press Jon Stewart 2007

External links 

Fear and Trembling online from Religion-Online.
 Furcht und Zittern: dialektische Lyrik (Fear and Trembling) German translation 1882
Fear and Trembling, Excerpts, translated by L.M. Hollander
 
SparkNotes Editors. "SparkNote on Søren Kierkegaard (1813–1855), Fear and Trembling" SparkNotes LLC. 2005. (accessed February 19, 2011)
Dorota Glowacka Sacrificing The Text: The Philosopher/Poet At Mount Moriah
The Suspension of the Ethical, by Lev Shestov accessdate 2011-02-19
 Encounter With Nothingness, An Essay on Existentialism, by Helmut Kuhn Professor of Philosophy at Emory University, Henry Regnery Company, Hinsdale, Illinois, 1949
Dr. Anthony Storm's Commentary on Fear and Trembling
Podcast of Clare Carlisle interviewed about Fear and Trembling on Philosophy Bites
Katz, Claire Elise, 2001
Robert Coles, 2001  p. 11-23
McGee, Kyle, May 19, 2006 
Dr Joel Rasmussen Kierkegaard: alienated man and the ethics of subjectivity 
The Autobiography of Goethe Truth and Fiction Relating To My Life Goethe's story of Abraham
NEH's EDSITEment student guide to reading Fear and Trembling

1843 non-fiction books
Books by Søren Kierkegaard
Ethics books
Books about sacrifice
Works published under a pseudonym